Gelechia palpialbella is a moth of the family Gelechiidae. It is found in North America, where it has been recorded from Texas.

The forewings are dark greyish-brown, with obscure small spots of dark velvety-brown on the wings.

References

Moths described in 1875
Gelechia